This article gives an outline of Formula One engines, also called Formula One power units since the hybrid era starting in 2014. Since its inception in 1947, Formula One has used a variety of engine regulations. "Formulae" limiting engine capacity had been used in Grand Prix racing on a regular basis since after World War I. The engine formulae are divided according to era.

Operation
Formula One currently uses 1.6 litre four-stroke turbocharged 90 degree V6 double-overhead camshaft (DOHC) reciprocating engines. They were introduced in 2014 and have been developed over the subsequent seasons.

The power a Formula One engine produces is generated by operating at a very high rotational speed, up to 20,000 revolutions per minute (rpm). However, they are electronically limited to 15,000 as of 2021 season. This contrasts with road car engines of a similar size, which typically operate at less than 6,000 rpm. The basic configuration of a naturally aspirated Formula One engine had not been greatly modified since the 1967 Ford Cosworth DFV and the mean effective pressure had stayed at around 14 bar. Until the mid-1980s Formula One engines were limited to around 12,000 rpm due to the traditional metal springs used to close the valves. The speed required to operate the engine valves at a higher rpm called for ever stiffer springs, which increased the power required to drive the camshaft and the valves to the point where the loss nearly offset the power gain through the increase in rpm. They were replaced by pneumatic valve springs introduced by Renault in 1986, which inherently have a rising rate (progressive rate) that allowed them to have an extremely high spring rate at larger valve strokes without much increasing the driving power requirements at smaller strokes, thus lowering the overall power loss. Since the 1990s, all Formula One engine manufacturers used pneumatic valve springs with the pressurised air allowing engines to reach speeds of over 20,000 rpm.

Short-stroke engine
Formula One cars use short-stroke engines. To operate at high engine speeds, the stroke must be relatively short to prevent catastrophic failure, usually from the connecting rod, which is under very large stresses at these speeds. Having a short stroke means a relatively large bore is required to reach a 1.6-litre displacement. This results in a less efficient combustion stroke, especially at lower rpm.

In addition to the use of pneumatic valve springs, a Formula One engine's high rpm output has been made possible due to advances in metallurgy and design, allowing lighter pistons and connecting rods to withstand the accelerations necessary to attain such high speeds. Improved design also allows narrower connecting rod ends and so narrower main bearings. This permits higher rpm with less bearing-damaging heat build-up. For each stroke, the piston goes from a virtual stop to almost twice the mean speed (approximately 40 m/s), then back to zero. This occurs once for each of the four strokes in the cycle: one Intake (down), one Compression (up), one Power (ignition-down), one Exhaust (up). Maximum piston acceleration occurs at top dead center and is in the region of 95,000 m/s2, about 10,000 times standard gravity (10,000 g).

History
Formula One engines have come through a variety of regulations, manufacturers and configurations through the years.

1947–1953
This era used pre-war voiturette engine regulations, with 4.5 L atmospheric and 1.5 L supercharged engines. The Indianapolis 500 (which was a round of the World Drivers' Championship from 1950 onwards) used pre-war Grand Prix regulations, with 4.5 L atmospheric and 3.0 L supercharged engines.

In 1952 and 1953, the World Drivers' Championship was run to Formula Two regulations, but the existing Formula One regulations remained in force and a number of Formula One races were still held in those years.

1954–1960
Naturally-aspirated engine size was reduced to 2.5 L and supercharged cars were limited to 750 cc. No constructor built a supercharged engine for the World Championship. The Indianapolis 500 continued to use old pre-war regulations.

1961–1965

Introduced in 1961 amidst some criticism, the new reduced engine 1.5 L formula took control of F1 just as every team and manufacturer switched from front to mid-engined cars. Although these were initially underpowered, by 1965 average power had increased by nearly 50% and lap times were faster than in 1960. The old 2.5 L formula had been retained for International Formula racing, but this did not achieve much success until the introduction of the Tasman Series in Australia and New Zealand during the winter season, leaving the 1.5 L cars as the fastest single seaters in Europe during this time.

1966–1986

In 1966, with sports cars capable of outrunning Formula One cars thanks to much larger and more powerful engines, the FIA increased engine capacity to 3.0 L atmospheric and 1.5 L compressed engines. Although a few manufacturers had been clamouring for larger engines, the transition was not smooth and 1966 was a transitional year, with 2.0 L versions of the BRM and Coventry-Climax V8 engines being used by several entrants. The appearance of the standard-produced Cosworth DFV in 1967 made it possible for small manufacturers to join the series with a chassis designed in-house. Compression devices were allowed for the first time since 1960, but it was not until 1977 that a company actually had the finance and interest of building one, when Renault debuted their new Gordini V6 turbocharged engine at that year's British Grand Prix at Silverstone. This engine had a considerable power advantage over the naturally-aspirated Cosworth DFV, Ferrari and Alfa Romeo engines. By the start of the 1980s, Renault had proved that turbocharging was the way to go in order to stay competitive in Formula One, particularly at high-altitude circuits like Kyalami in South Africa and Interlagos in Brazil. Ferrari introduced their all-new V6 turbocharged engine in 1981, before Brabham owner Bernie Ecclestone managed to persuade BMW to manufacture straight-4 turbos for his team from 1982 onwards. In 1983, Alfa Romeo introduced a V8 turbo, and by the end of that year Honda and Porsche had introduced their own V6 turbos (the latter badged as TAG in deference to the company that provided the funding). Cosworth and the Italian Motori Moderni concern also manufactured V6 turbos during the 1980s, while Hart Racing Engines manufactured their own straight-4 turbo. By mid-1985, every Formula One car was running with a turbocharged engine. By 1986, power figures were reaching unprecedented levels, with all engines reaching over  during qualifying with unrestricted turbo boost pressures. This was especially seen with the BMW engines of Benetton's cars, reaching around 1,400 hp (1,040 kW) at a 5.5 bar boost pressure during qualifying. However, these engines and gearboxes were very unreliable because of the engine's immense power, and would only last about four laps. For the race, the turbocharger's boost was restricted to ensure engine reliability; but the engines still produced  during the race. Following their experiences at Indianapolis, in 1971 Lotus made a few unsuccessful experiments with a Pratt & Whitney turbine fitted to chassis which also had four-wheel-drive.

1987–1988
Following the turbo domination, forced induction was allowed for two seasons before its eventual ban. The FIA regulations limited boost pressure, to 4 bar in qualifying in 1987 for 1.5 L turbo; and allowed a larger 3.5 L formula. These seasons were still dominated by turbocharged engines, the Honda RA167E V6 supplying Nelson Piquet winning the 1987 Formula One season on a Williams also winning the constructors championship, followed by TAG-Porsche P01 V6 in McLaren then Honda again with the previous RA166E for Lotus then Ferrari's own 033D V6.

The rest of the grid was powered by the Ford GBA V6 turbo in Benetton, with the only naturally-aspirated engine, the DFV-derived Ford-Cosworth DFZ 3.5 L V8 outputting  in Tyrrell, Lola, AGS, March and Coloni. The massively powerful BMW M12/13 inline-four found in the Brabham BT55 tilted almost horizontally, and in upright position under the Megatron brand in Arrows and Ligier, producing  at 3.8 bar in race trim, and an incredible  at 5.5 bar of boost in qualifying spec. Zakspeed was building its own turbo inline-four, Alfa Romeo was to power the Ligiers with an inline-four but the deal fell through after initial testing had been carried out. Alfa was still represented by its old 890T V8 used by Osella, and Minardi was powered by a Motori Moderni V6.

In , six teams – McLaren, Ferrari, Lotus, Arrows, Osella and Zakspeed – continued with turbocharged engines, now limited to 2.5 bar. Honda's V6 turbo, the RA168E, which produced  at 12,300 rpm in qualifying, powered the McLaren MP4/4 with which Ayrton Senna and Alain Prost won fifteen of the sixteen races between them. The Honda turbo also powered Lotus's 100T, while Arrows continued with the Megatron-badged BMW turbo, Osella continued with the Alfa Romeo V8 (now badged as an Osella) and Zakspeed continued with their own straight-4 turbo. All the other teams used naturally aspirated 3.5 L V8 engines: Benetton used the Cosworth DFR, which produced  at 11,000 rpm; Williams, March and Ligier used the Judd CV, producing ; and the rest of the grid used the previous year's  Cosworth DFZ.

1989–1994

Turbochargers were banned from the 1989 Formula One season, leaving only a naturally aspirated 3.5 L formula. Honda was still dominant with their RA109E 72° V10 giving  @ 13,500 rpm on McLaren cars, enabling Prost to win the championship in front of his teammate Senna. Behind were the Renault RS1-powered Williams, a 67° V10 giving  @ 12,500 rpm. Ferrari with its 035/5 65° V12 giving  at 13,000 rpm. Behind, the grid was powered mainly by Ford Cosworth DFR V8 giving  @ 10,750 rpm except for a few Judd CV V8 in Lotus, Brabham and EuroBrun cars, and two oddballs: the  Lamborghini 3512 80° V12 powering Lola, and the  Yamaha OX88 75° V8 in Zakspeed cars. Ford started to try its new design, the 75° V8 HBA1 with Benetton.

The 1990 Formula One season was again dominated by Honda in McLarens with the  @ 13,500 rpm RA100E powering Ayrton Senna and Gerhard Berger ahead of the  @ 12,750 rpm Ferrari Tipo 036 of Alain Prost and Nigel Mansell. Behind them the Ford HBA4 for Benetton and Renault RS2 for Williams with  @ 12,800 rpm were leading the pack powered by Ford DFR and Judd CV engines. The exceptions were the Lamborghini 3512 in Lola and Lotus, and the new Judd EV 76° V8 giving  @ 12,500 rpm in Leyton House and Brabham cars. The two new contenders were the Life which built for themselves an F35 W12 with three four cylinders banks @ 60°, and Subaru giving Coloni a 1235 flat-12 from Motori Moderni

Honda was still leading the 1991 Formula One season in Senna's McLaren with the  @ 13,500–14,500 rpm 60° V12 RA121E, just ahead of the Renault RS3 powered Williams benefiting from  @ 12,500–13,000 rpm. Ferrari was behind with its Tipo 037, a new 65° V12 giving  @ 13,800 rpm also powering Minardi, just ahead the Ford HBA4/5/6 in Benetton and Jordan cars. Behind, Tyrrell was using the previous Honda RA109E, Judd introduced its new GV with Dallara leaving the previous EV to Lotus, Yamaha were giving its  OX99 70° V12 to Brabham, Lamborghini engines were used by Modena and Ligier. Ilmor introduced its LH10, a  @ 13,000 rpm V10 which eventually became the Mercedes with Leyton House and Porsche sourced a little successful 3512 V12 to Footwork Arrows; the rest of the field was Ford DFR powered.

In 1992, the Renault engines became dominant, even more so following the departure from the sport of Honda at the end of 1992. The 3.5 L Renault V10 engines powering the Williams F1 team produced a power output between  @ 13,000–14,300 rpm toward the end of the 3.5 L naturally-aspirated era, between 1992 and 1994. Renault-engined cars won the last three consecutive world constructors' championships of the 3.5 L formula era with Williams (1992–1994).

The Peugeot A4 V10, used by the McLaren Formula One team in 1994, initially developed  @ 14,250 rpm. It was later further developed into the A6, which produced even more power, developing  @ 14,500 rpm.

The EC Zetec-R V8, which powered the championship-winning Benetton team and Michael Schumacher in 1994, produced between  @ 14,500 rpm.

By the end of the 1994 season, Ferrari's Tipo 043 V12 was putting out around  @ 15,800 rpm, which is to date the most-powerful naturally-aspirated V12 engine ever used in Formula One. This was also the most powerful engine of 3.5-litre engine regulation era, before a reduction in engine capacity to 3 litres in 1995.

1995–2005

Despite engine displacement being reduced from 3.5 L, power figures and RPMs still managed to climb. Renault was the initial dominant engine supplier from 1995 until 1997, winning the first three world championships with Williams and Benetton in this era. The championship-winning 1995 Benetton B195 produced a power output of  @ 15,200 rpm, and the 1996 championship-winning Williams FW18 produced  @ 16,000 rpm; both from a shared Renault RS9 3.0 L V10 engine. The 1997 championship-winning FW19 produced between  @ 16,000 rpm, from its Renault RS9B 3.0 L V10. The engine's design was largely influenced by major regulation changes imposed by the FIA after the dreadful events during the year before: the V12 engine was reduced from 3.5 to 3.0 litres. The 3.0-litre engine produced around 700 hp (522 kW) 17,000 rpm in race trim; but was reportedly capable of producing up to 760 hp (567 kW) in its highest state of tune for qualification mode. Between 1995 and 2000, cars using this 3.0 L engine formula, imposed by the FIA, produced a constant power range (depending on engine type and tuning), varying between 600 hp and 815 hp. From 1998 to 2000 it was Mercedes' power that ruled, giving Mika Häkkinen two world championships. The 1999 McLaren MP4/14 produced between 785 and 810 hp @ 17,000 rpm. Ferrari gradually improved their engine. In , they changed from their traditional V12 engine to a smaller and lighter V10 engine. They preferred reliability to power, losing out to Mercedes in terms of outright power initially. Ferrari's first V10 engine, in 1996, produced  @ 15,550 rpm, down on power from their most powerful 3.5 L V12 (in 1994), which produced over  @ 15,800 rpm, but up on power from their last 3.0 L V12 (in 1995), which produced  @ 17,000 rpm. To keep costs down, the 3.0 L V10 engine configuration was made fully mandatory for all teams in 2000 so that engine builders would not develop and experiment with other configurations. The V10 configuration had been the most popular since the banning of turbocharged engines in 1989, and no other configuration had been used since 1998.

BMW started supplying its engines to Williams from 2000. The engine was very reliable in the first season though slightly short of power compared to Ferrari and Mercedes units. The BMW E41-powered Williams FW22 produced around 810 hp @ 17,500 rpm, during the 2000 season. BMW went straight forward with its engine development. The P81, used during the 2001 season, was able to hit 17,810 rpm. Unfortunately, reliability was a large issue with several blowups during the season.

The BMW P82, the engine used by the BMW WilliamsF1 Team in 2002, had hit a peak speed of 19,050 rpm in its final evolutionary stage. It was also the first engine in the 3.0 litre V10-era to break through the 19,000 rpm wall, during the 2002 Italian Grand Prix's qualifying. Honda's RA003E V10 also cleared the  mark at the 2003 Canadian Grand Prix.

In 2005, the 3.0 L V10 engine was permitted no more than 5 valves per cylinder. Also, the FIA introduced new regulations limiting each car to one engine per two Grand Prix weekends, putting the emphasis on increased reliability. In spite of this, power outputs continued to rise.

2006–2013

For 2006, the engines had to be 90° V8 of 2.4 litres maximum capacity with a circular bore of  maximum, which implies a  stroke at maximum bore. The engines must have two inlet and two exhaust valves per cylinder, be naturally aspirated and have a  minimum weight. The previous year's engines with a rev-limiter were permitted for 2006 and 2007 for teams who were unable to acquire a V8 engine, with Scuderia Toro Rosso using a Cosworth V10, after Red Bull's takeover of the former Minardi team did not include the new engines. The 2006 season saw the highest rev limits in the history of Formula One, at well over 20,000 rpm; before a 19,000 rpm mandatory rev limiter was implemented for all competitors in 2007. Cosworth was able to achieve just over 20,000 rpm with their V8, and Renault around 20,500 rpm. Honda did the same; albeit only on the dynamometer.

Pre-cooling air before it enters the cylinders, injection of any substance other than air and fuel into the cylinders, variable-geometry intake and exhaust systems, and variable valve timing were forbidden. Each cylinder could have only one fuel injector and a single plug spark ignition. Separate starting devices were used to start engines in the pits and on the grid. The crankcase and cylinder block had to be made of cast or wrought aluminium alloys. The crankshaft and camshafts had to be made from an iron alloy, pistons from an aluminium alloy, and valves from alloys based on iron, nickel, cobalt or titanium. These restrictions were in place to reduce development costs on the engines.

The reduction in capacity was designed to give a power reduction of around 20% from the three-litre engines, to reduce the increasing speeds of Formula One cars. Despite this, in many cases the performance of the car improved.  In 2006 Toyota F1 announced an approximate  output at 18,000 rpm for its new RVX-06 engine, but real figures are of course difficult to obtain. Most cars from this period (2006–2008) produced a regular power output of approximately between 720 and 800 hp @ 19,000 rpm (over 20,000 rpm for the  season).

The engine specification was frozen in 2007 to keep development costs down. The engines which were used in the 2006 Japanese Grand Prix were used for the 2007 and 2008 seasons and they were limited to 19,000 rpm. In 2009 the limit was reduced to 18,000 rpm with each driver allowed to use a maximum of 8 engines over the season. Any driver needing an additional engine is penalised 10 places on the starting grid for the first race the engine is used. This increases the importance of reliability, although the effect is only seen towards the end of the season. Certain design changes intended to improve engine reliability may be carried out with permission from the FIA. This has led to some engine manufacturers, notably Ferrari and Mercedes, exploiting this ability by making design changes which not only improve reliability but also boost engine power output as a side effect. As the Mercedes engine was proven to be the strongest, re-equalisations of engines were allowed by the FIA to allow other manufacturers to match the power.

2009 saw the exit of Honda from Formula One. The team was acquired by Ross Brawn, creating Brawn GP and the BGP 001.  With the absence of the Honda engine, Brawn GP retrofitted the Mercedes engine to the BGP 001 chassis. The newly branded team won both the Constructors' Championship and the Drivers' Championship from better-known and better-established contenders Ferrari, McLaren-Mercedes, and Renault.

Cosworth, absent since the 2006 season, returned in 2010. New teams Lotus Racing, HRT, and Virgin Racing, along with the established Williams, used this engine. The season also saw the withdrawal of the BMW and Toyota engines, as the car companies withdrew from Formula One due to the recession.

In 2009, constructors were allowed to use kinetic energy recovery systems (KERS), also called regenerative brakes. Energy can either be stored as mechanical energy (as in a flywheel) or as electrical energy (as in a battery or supercapacitor), with a maximum power of 81 hp (60 kW; 82 PS) deployed by an electric motor, for a little over 6 seconds per lap. Four teams used it at some point in the season: Ferrari, Renault, BMW, and McLaren.

Although KERS was still legal in F1 in the 2010 season, all the teams agreed not to use it. KERS returned for the 2011 season, when only three teams elected not to use it. For the 2012 season, only Marussia and HRT raced without KERS, and in 2013 all teams on the grid had KERS. From 2010 to 2013 cars have a regular power of 700–800 hp, averaging around 750 hp @ 18,000 rpm.

2014–2021
The FIA announced to change the 2.4-litre V8 to 1.6-litre V6 hybrid engines for the 2014 season. The new regulations allow kinetic and heat energy recovery systems. Forced induction is now allowed, and instead of limiting the boost level, fuel flow restriction at 100 kg of petrol per hour maximum is introduced. The engines sounded very different due to the lower rev limit (15,000 rpm) and the turbocharger. While superchargers are allowed, all constructors opted to use a turbo.

These have their efficiency improved through turbo-compounding by recovering energy from exhaust gases. The original proposal for four-cylinder turbocharged engines was not welcomed by the racing teams, in particular Ferrari. Adrian Newey stated during the 2011 European Grand Prix that the change to a V6 enables teams to carry the engine as a stressed member, whereas an inline-4 would have required a space frame. A compromise was reached, allowing V6 forced induction engines instead. The engines rarely exceed 12,000 rpm during qualifying and race, due to the new fuel flow restrictions.

KERS was renamed Motor Generator Unit–Kinetic. Heat energy recovery systems were also allowed, under the name Motor Generator Unit–Heat

The 2015 season was an improvement on 2014, adding about 30–50 hp (20–40 kW) to most engines, the Mercedes engine being the most powerful with 870 hp (649 kW). In 2019, Renault's engine was claimed to have hit 1,000 hp in qualifying trim.

Of the previous manufacturers, only Mercedes, Ferrari and Renault produced engines to the new formula in 2014, whereas Cosworth stopped supplying engines. Honda returned in 2015 with their own engine, while McLaren used Honda power, changing from Mercedes power in 2014. In 2019, Red Bull switched from using a Renault engine to Honda power. Honda supplied both Red Bull and AlphaTauri.

2022–2025
In 2017, the FIA began negotiations with existing constructors and potential new manufacturers over the next generation of engines with a projected introduction date of  but delayed to  due to the effects of the COVID-19 pandemic. The initial proposal was designed to simplify engine designs, cut costs, promote new entries and address criticisms directed at the 2014 generation of engines. It called for the 1.6 L V6 configuration to be retained, but abandoned the complex Motor Generator Unit–Heat system. The Motor Generator Unit–Kinetic would be more powerful, with a greater emphasis on driver deployment and a more flexible introduction to allow for tactical use. The proposal also called for the introduction of standardised components and design parameters to make components produced by all manufacturers compatible with one another in a system dubbed "plug in and play". A further proposal to allow four-wheel drive cars was also made, with the front axle driven by an  unit—as opposed to the traditional driveshaft—that functioned independently of the  providing power to the rear axle, mirroring the system developed by Porsche for the 919 Hybrid race car.

However, mostly due to no new engine supplier applying for F1 entry in 2021 and 2022, abolishment of the MGU-H, a more powerful MGU-K and a four-wheel drive system were all shelved with the possibility of their re-introduction for 2026. Instead, the teams and FIA agreed to a radical change in body/chassis aerodynamics to promote more battles on the course at closer distances to each other. They further agreed to an increase in alcohol content from 5.75% to 10% of fuel, and to implement a freeze on power unit design for 2022-2025, with the ICE, turbocharger and MGU-H being frozen on March 1 and the energy store, MGU-K and control electronics being frozen on September 1 during the 2022 season. Honda, the outgoing engine supplier in 2021, was keen to keep the MGU-H, and Red Bull, who took over the engine production project, backed that opinion.  The 4WD system was planned to be based on Porsche 919 Hybrid system, but Porsche ended up not becoming an F1 engine supplier for 2021-2022.

2026 onwards
On 16 August 2022 it was announced that new engine regulations had been agreed for 2026 and beyond. These engine regulations will see the turbocharged 1.6 V6 internal combustion engine configuration  used since 2014 retained albeit with ICE power output reduced to around 400kw  (approximately 570 bhp) down from 750bhp + whilst the MGU-K's electrical energy capacity will be increased to 350kw (460 bhp) and the MGU-H removed. In addition, fuel flow rates will be measured and limited based on energy, rather than mass or volume of the fuel itself. There is also intended to be further restrictions on components such as MGU-Ks and exhausts imposed from 2027.

Audi announced in August 2022 that it would become a power unit manufacturer from  onwards. In February 2023, Ford announced their return as a power unit supplier for 2026 after nearly 20 years of absence in Formula One and will partner with Red Bull Powertrains as Red Bull Ford Powertrains. Honda, under its subsidiary Honda Racing Corporation, has also been provisionally listed as a manufacturer for 2026 by the FIA after officially leaving the sport in 2021. The FIA also confirmed that Ferrari, Mercedes-AMG and Alpine are registered as power unit suppliers for 2026.

Engine regulation progression by era

Notes:

Current engine technical specifications

Combustion, construction, operation, power, fuel and lubrication
Manufacturers: Mercedes-Benz, Renault (including TAG Heuer rebadging until 2018), Ferrari and Honda
Type: Hybrid-powered 4-stroke piston Otto-cycle with efficient combustion process and greater emission engine burning
Configuration: V6 single hybrid turbocharger engine
V-angle: 90° cylinder angle
Displacement: 
Bore: Maximum 
Stroke: 
Valvetrain: DOHC, 24-valve (four valves per cylinder)
Fuel: 98–102 RON unleaded petroleum + 5.75% biofuel
Fuel delivery: Petrol direct injection
Direct fuel injection pressure: 
Fuel flow limit: 100 kg/h 
Aspiration: Single-turbocharged
Power output:  @ 10,000 rpm through 12,000 rpm
Torque: Approx. 
Lubrication: Dry sump
Maximum revs: 15,000 rpm (maximum allowed by the regulations, in practice no engine goes much above 12,000 rpm as there is no practical benefit to it)
Engine management: McLaren TAG-320 (2018) later TAG-320B (2019–present)
Max. speed: Approximately  (Monza, Baku and Mexico);  normal tracks
Mass:  complete
Cooling: Single water pump
Ignition: High energy inductive
Exhaust systems: Single exhaust with central exit and extra double small exhaust

Forced induction
Turbocharger mass:  depending on the turbine housing used
Turbocharger spin rev limit: 125,000 rpm 
Pressure charging: Single-stage compressor and exhaust turbine, a common-shaft
Turbo boost level pressure: Unlimited but mainly typical  absolute
Wastegate: Maximum of two, electronic- or pneumatic-controlled

ERS systems
MGU-K RPM: Max 50,000 rpm
MGU-K power: Max 120 kW
Energy recovered by MGU-K: Max 2 MJ/lap
Energy released by MGU-K: Max 4 MJ/lap from the Energy Storage, unlimited from the MGU-H
MGU-H RPM: >100,000 rpm
Energy recovered by MGU-H: Unlimited (> 2MJ/lap)

Records

Figures correct as of the 2023 Saudi Arabian Grand Prix

Bold indicates engine manufacturers that have competed in Formula One in the 2023 season.

World Championship Grand Prix wins by engine manufacturer

Most wins in a season

By number

By percentage

* Only Alberto Ascari raced in the 1952 Indianapolis 500 with Ferrari.** Alfa Romeo did not race in the 1950 Indianapolis 500.

Most consecutive wins

Entry of new engine suppliers
In December 2021, Audi has written to the outgoing president of the FIA, Jean Todt, advising him of their intention to enter Formula One from 2026. This is when new engine regulations take effect to introduce more environmentally-friendly powertrains. The Volkswagen Group is evaluating entries from Audi and Porsche and is "close to the finishing line" in terms of its entry into F1.

This would be the first foray of Porsche in Formula One since 1991.

See also

 List of Formula One engine manufacturers

Notes

References

External links

 Formula One Engines In-depth article covering facts, evolution and tech specs of F1 engines 2009
 Racecar Engineering F1 Engines

 
Engines
Automobile engines